Jackson Hotel may refer to:

Jackson Hotel (Paola, Kansas), listed on the National Register of Historic Places in Miami County, Kansas
Jackson Hotel (Anoka, Minnesota), listed on the National Register of Historic Places in Anoka County, Minnesota